The 1988 SWAC men's basketball tournament was held March 10–12, 1988, at the F. G. Clark Activity Center in Baton Rouge, Louisiana. Southern defeated , 78–62 in the championship game to capture their second straight SWAC Tournament title. The Jaguars received the conference's automatic bid to the 1988 NCAA tournament as No. 15 seed in the Southeast Region.

Bracket and results

References

1987–88 Southwestern Athletic Conference men's basketball season
SWAC men's basketball tournament
SWAC men's basketball tournament
Sports competitions in Baton Rouge, Louisiana
College basketball tournaments in Louisiana
SWAC men's basketball tournament